Mesothen pyrrha is a moth of the subfamily Arctiinae. It was described by William Schaus in 1889. It is found in Mexico, Honduras, Colombia and French Guiana.

References

Mesothen (moth)
Moths described in 1889